Werrington may refer to any of the following places.

United Kingdom
Werrington, Cornwall, England
Werrington, Peterborough in Cambridgeshire, England
 Werrington Dive Under, railway junction near Werrington.
Werrington, Staffordshire, England

Australia
Werrington, New South Wales